This is the results breakdown of the local elections held in Navarre on 28 May 1995. The following tables show detailed results in the autonomous community's most populous municipalities, sorted alphabetically.

Overall

City control
The following table lists party control in the most populous municipalities, including provincial capitals (shown in bold). Gains for a party are displayed with the cell's background shaded in that party's colour.

Municipalities

Barañain
Population: 18,946

Burlada
Population: 15,690

Estella
Population: 12,861

Pamplona
Population: 182,465

Tafalla
Population: 10,329

Tudela
Population: 27,303

See also
1995 Navarrese regional election

References

Navarre
1995